Ogo, Senegal may refer to:
Ogo (arrondissement), an arrondissement of Matam, Senegal
Ogo, Diourbel, a village in Diourbel Region, Senegal
Ogo, Louga, a village in Louga Region, Senegal

See also
Ogo (disambiguation)